Low is an American indie rock band from Duluth, Minnesota, formed in 1993 by Alan Sparhawk (guitar and vocals) and Mimi Parker (drums and vocals). The band was a trio from 1993 to 2020, having featured four different bassists. Parker was a member from its formation until her death in 2022.

The music of Low is characterized by slow tempos and minimalist arrangements. Early descriptions sometimes referred to it as a rock subgenre called "slowcore" often compared to the band Bedhead, who played this style during the early 1990s. However, Low's members ultimately disapproved of the term.

Parker and Sparhawk's vocal harmonies represent perhaps the group's most distinctive element; critic Denise Sullivan writes that their shared vocals are "as chilling as anything Gram [Parsons] and Emmylou [Harris] ever conspired on—though that's not to say it's country-tinged, just straight from the heart." Low's style grew experimental over time, gradually incorporating elements of electronica and glitch on later releases, while retaining their minimalist approach.

History

The band formed in early 1993. Sparhawk had been playing in the Superior, Wisconsin band Zen Identity, the core of which was formed by drummer Robb Berry and vocalist Bill Walton. That band needed a new bassist, and recruited future Low bassist John Nichols. At that time, Nichols was a senior at Superior Senior High School, and bassist in the band Lorenzo's Tractor. Sparhawk taught Zen Identity songs to Nichols and during practices, the two started improvising with some very modest, quiet themes. As a joke, they wondered what would happen if they played such quiet music in front of Duluth crowds, which at that point focused around the loud, grunge, "post-punk" sound. Soon, the joke became a serious thought. Sparhawk left Zen Identity, who continued to perform and record without him, and he and Nichols recruited Sparhawk's wife Mimi Parker to play a very modest drum kit composed of a single snare drum, single cymbal, and a single floor tom. She was to use brushes almost exclusively, rather than drum sticks. Sparhawk said they played their first two shows in 1993 at the RecyclaBell in Duluth, Minnesota. 

Low's debut album, I Could Live in Hope, was released on Virgin Records' Vernon Yard imprint in 1994. It featured Nichols on bass, though he was replaced by Zak Sally, who joined for the recording of the band's next album Long Division. Both I Could Live in Hope and Long Division were produced and recorded by Kramer. Long Division and its similar follow-up, 1996's The Curtain Hits the Cast, established the band as critical darlings; extensive touring helped them to develop a highly devoted fan base. "Over the Ocean", a single drawn from The Curtain Hits the Cast, also became something of a hit on college radio.

By the time of their next full-length album, 1999's Secret Name, Low had moved to the independent label Kranky. In between, they released several singles and EPs. In 1999, Low joined forces with Dirty Three to record an In The Fishtank session for Konkurrent records. Allmusic called the six-song disc "some of the best material either unit has produced." Of particular note is the disc's lengthy cover of Neil Young's "Down by the River". 2001 saw the release of Things We Lost in the Fire.

The following year saw the release of the band's final full-length on Kranky, Trust. All three of the band's full-length releases on Kranky featured superstar producers: Secret Name and Things We Lost in the Fire feature the work of recording engineer Steve Albini, who proved sympathetic to capturing the band's strengths; while Trust was recorded by Tom Herbers along with Duluth engineer Eric Swanson and mixed by Tchad Blake at Peter Gabriel's Real World Studios.

In April 2003, Peter S. Scholtes of the Twin Cities weekly paper City Pages posted in his weblog that Zak Sally had left Low. The following month, the band posted an update to the news on their website: "We have all had to work through some personal things recently ... After sorting it out, the good news is that Zak is remaining in the band ..." In July 2003, they toured Europe with Radiohead, Sally in tow. Following a successful tour in early 2004 that vividly demonstrated the band's commitment to their fans (Parker was visibly pregnant throughout), the band signaled their intent to continue making music by signing with powerhouse indie label Sub Pop. To tie up the loose ends of the era, Low released a three-disc rarities compilation on its own Chairkickers label in 2004.

Beginning with Secret Name, the band have diversified their sound. The band use subtle electronic music touches to augment their sound, reflective of their tenure with Kranky and their exposure to the Midwest's post-rock scene. Adding a more overt rock element to their aesthetic, the band has used fuzz bass from Things We Lost In the Fire onward, and began using distorted lead guitar on Trust. The band's 2005 album, The Great Destroyer, nods even further in the direction of rock. Recorded with producer Dave Fridmann and released by Sub Pop in January 2005, The Great Destroyer has received mostly positive reviews; the Village Voice described the record's "comparatively thunderous verve".

Low cancelled the second leg of their extensive tour in support of The Great Destroyer in late spring of 2005. Sparhawk published a statement on the band's website, addressed directly to fans, detailing his personal problems with depression that resulted in the cancellation of the tour. In August 2005, Sparhawk announced his return to performance, embarking on a US tour with former Red House Painters frontman Mark Kozelek. In October 2005, Sally announced he was leaving the band. Low replaced Sally with Matt Livingston, a bassist and saxophonist from Duluth's musical scene. In addition to playing bass guitar, Livingston also played an antique Navy chaplain's pump organ in the group.

After appearing on 2007's Drums and Guns and touring with the group, Matt Livingston left Low in 2008, to be replaced by Steve Garrington. Garrington would perform with the band for the next 12 years and four studio albums: 2011's Cmon, 2013's The Invisible Way, 2015's Ones and Sixes and 2018's Double Negative. 

Sparhawk and Parker provided guest vocals on "Lunacy", the opening track on Swans' 2012 album The Seer.

In June 2021, the band announced an upcoming release on Sub Pop entitled Hey What. The album was released on September 10. With the announcement of the album came news of Garrington's departure from the band a year prior, turning Low into an official duo for the first time in their career. It was soon announced that the band had hired Charlie Parr bassist Liz Draper to support Hey What on tour.

Parker was diagnosed with ovarian cancer in late 2020; she began treatment in 2021 and publicly revealed the diagnosis during a podcast interview in January 2022. In August 2022, the band cancelled some European shows to accommodate Parker's treatment. In September, the band cancelled its dates opening for Death Cab for Cutie in the United States. In October, the band cancelled the remainder of their 2022 European tour dates, due to continued concerns about Parker's health. Parker died on November 5, 2022.

Performance

Low are known for their live performances. Rock club audiences sometimes watch the band while seated on the floor. During their early career, the band often faced unsympathetic and inattentive audiences in bars and clubs, to which they responded by bucking rock protocol and turning their volume down. The dynamic range of their early music made it susceptible to background noise and chatter, since many of their songs were very quiet. A performance in 1996 at the South by Southwest festival was overpowered when a Scandinavian hardcore band was booked downstairs. The Trust album marked a turning point, and Low's music has developed a more emphatic sound.

Their shows often feature drastically reinterpreted cover versions of famous songs by Joy Division and The Smiths, in addition to their own original material. In performance, Low shows off a sense of humor not necessarily found on their recordings; a tour in early 2004 featured a cover of OutKast's hit song "Hey Ya!". At a gig in Los Angeles on Halloween 1998, the band took the stage as a Misfits tribute act, complete with corpse paint and black clothing.

At the 2008 End of the Road Festival in Dorset, England, Sparhawk abruptly ended the band's performance by ripping the strings and lead out of his guitar, throwing it to the ground and then hurling it into the crowd before exiting the stage. He had earlier informed the audience that it had been a "crappy day". In 2010 they performed The Great Destroyer at Primavera Sound Festival On Friday July 13, 2012, Low gave a candlelit concert at Halifax Minster.

Low's performance at the 2013 Rock the Garden concert consisted of a slowed and lengthened version of their drone rock song "Do You Know How to Waltz?" followed by Alan saying, "Drone, not drones," a reference to an anti-drone sticker made by Minneapolis's Luke Heiken; the performance resulted in mass audience confusion and divisive online discussion. The performance lasted half an hour and was broadcast live on the Current which had been playing cuts of their recent album. Low had performed a more traditional show for the Current at the Fitzgerald earlier in the year.

On September 4, 2022, Low took the stage at the Water is Life Festival in Duluth, MN, closing with Canada from their 2002 album Trust.

Commercial success
The band's mainstream exposure was limited in the early part of their career. Their best-known song is arguably a hymnal version of "The Little Drummer Boy", which was featured in a Gap television ad that depicted a snowball fight in slow-motion to match the song's glacial tempo. 

Starting with Things We Lost in the Fire (2001), Low's albums began to appear on sales charts in Europe and then gradually in the United States as well. A remix of their "Halflight" was featured in the Mothman Prophecies motion picture in 2002. The band made their network television debut in 2005 by performing the single "California" on an episode of Last Call with Carson Daly. On June 11, 2007, Scott Bateman, a web animator, announced that his video for Low's song Hatchet (Optimimi version) would be one of the preloads on the new Zune. Also in 2007 they recorded a song called "Family Tree" which featured in the "Careful" episode of Nick Jr's kids' show Yo Gabba Gabba!

On March 24, 2008, their song "Point of Disgust" was featured in the UK television show Skins, prompting a rush of download sales from iTunes. Another of their songs, "Sunflower", was featured in the following episode (episode 9), and "Breaker" was featured in a later episode. As the music supervisor of Skins declared in the Episode Track Listing section of the show's official website: "You may have guessed by now that we are all pretty huge fans of Low in the Skins office[...]".

The 2008 movie KillShot, starring Mickey Rourke and Diane Lane, features the song "Monkey" early in the film. The 2003 documentary film Tarnation by Jonathan Caouette features the Low tracks "Laser Beam", "Embrace" and "Back Home Again" alongside tracks by artists such as Red House Painters and The Magnetic Fields. "Laser Beam" also featured on episode 4 season 2 of Misfits. Low was the subject of the 2008 documentary Low: You May Need a Murderer.

In 2010, Robert Plant recorded two Low songs for inclusion on his album Band of Joy, "Monkey" and "Silver Rider" from the LP The Great Destroyer. In an interview, Plant said of The Great Destroyer, "It's great music; it's always been in the house playing away beside Jerry Lee Lewis and Howlin' Wolf, you know. There's room for everything." It is rumored that Plant was introduced to Low's music by guitarist/producer Buddy Miller; Miller worked with Low in the past, and played guitar on Band of Joy. Curiously, writing credits for both "Monkey" and "Silver Rider" are listed in the "Band of Joy" liner notes as "Zachary Micheletti, Mimi Parker, George Sparhawk" per the official listing in BMI's publishing database. It is notable that Sparhawk performs under the pseudonym "Chicken-Bone George" in his side project Black Eyed Snakes. The band were chosen by Jeff Mangum of Neutral Milk Hotel to perform at the All Tomorrow's Parties festival in March 2012 in Minehead, England.

Personal lives

George Alan Sparhawk (born 1968 or 1969) and Mimi Jo Parker (1967–2022) first met while attending grade school in a small town outside of Bemidji, Minnesota. They married and moved to Duluth, where they formed the band. They had two children, Hollis and Cyrus and are members of the Church of Jesus Christ of Latter-day Saints, about which Sparhawk has said, "our spiritual beliefs encompass our whole life and understanding of who we are and what we do." Prior to moving to Minnesota at the age of nine, Sparhawk lived in Seattle. 

Sparhawk has done charity work with the Maasai tribe in Kenya. After a friend of his became a friend of the village of Namuncha, he played a Christmas show in order to raise funds to build a school there, where students had previously been meeting in the shade outside. He calls the experience of visiting the Maasai one of the most spiritual of his life.

Parker died on November 5, 2022. She was diagnosed with cancer in December 2020, but she did not disclose her illness until the next summer, when the band was forced to cancel multiple dates. In addition to Sparhawk, she is survived by their children, Hollis and Cyrus; her mother; and her sisters, Cindy Elam and Wanda Larson.

Her death was announced by the band's official Twitter account on November 6 with the message: "Friends, it's hard to put the universe into language and into a short message, but she passed away last night, surrounded by family and love, including yours. Keep her name close and sacred. Share this moment with someone who needs you. Love is indeed the most important thing."

Side projects
Low owns a record label, Chairkickers' Union, which releases material by other musicians such as Rivulets and Haley Bonar, as well as some of their own material. Sparhawk is notably active in Duluth's small but vibrant independent music scene; he operates a recording studio in the town, in a deconsecrated church that naturally provides the lush reverb characteristic of Low's sound. The Chairkickers label offers another outlet for Duluth musicians, as most groups on the label are from that city, or at least from Minnesota and surrounding areas.

Sally has toured as a bassist with Dirty Three, and Sparhawk has devoted considerable time and energy to his Black Eyed Snakes project, a blues-rock revival band quite far removed from the Low aesthetic. Recently Sparhawk has also been seen with a new side project called The Retribution Gospel Choir. Matt Livingston, who became Low's bassist in late 2005, also played in The Retribution Gospel Choir, and was subsequently replaced by Steve Garrington. On Retribution's first tour (fall 2005), they played the Low song "From Your Place on Sunset". Musical crossover between Sparhawk's bands went in both directions as two songs originally released on a RGC tour EP, "Hatchet" and "Breaker", were later covered on Low's Drums and Guns release (before making it onto RGC's self-titled full-length debut). Similarly, Low and the Black-Eyed Snakes have played some overlapping songs, such as "Lordy".

As a solo artist, Sparhawk released his debut album entitled Solo Guitar in August 2006. He also released a track on a various artists compilation, Songs for the End of the World, as Hollis M. Sparhawk & Her Father, and the track "Be Nice To People With Lice" on the various artists compilation album See You on the Moon!. In 2007 he did a Take-Away Show acoustic video session shot by Vincent Moon.

Sparhawk and Sally also made several recordings in a more synthesizer-driven style, reminiscent of the band Orchestral Manoeuvres in the Dark, under the name The Hospital People. The most widely distributed of these was "Crash / We'll Be Philosophers", released as a 7-inch on clear vinyl by Duck Suit Records. Sparhawk and Sally have also played live as The Tooth Fairies, with Sally performing on drums and Sean Erspamer on bass; Tooth Fairies sets have typically consisted of cover songs by the Stooges, MC5, and similar bands. Sally has generated several works that fall in the 'graphic novel' genre, and also created the original artwork for David Bazan's (formerly of Pedro the Lion) first solo effort, the EP Fewer Moving Parts, which was recently re-released by Barsuk. At one time, Mimi Parker was rumored to have started a punk band called Rubbersnake, but this was an inside joke on the part of the band. In 2007 Sparhawk did a Take-Away Show acoustic video session shot by Vincent Moon.

In April 2012, Low collaborated with artist Peter Liversidge for their performance at the Royal Festival Hall in London. Low collaborated with the artist again for their performance at the Barbican Centre in London in April 2013.

In 2011, Sparhawk began collaborating with fellow Duluth violinist/vocalist Gaelynn Lea on a band called The Murder of Crows. The duo
plays Lea's originals, instrumentals, and covers, using looping pedals and pared-down arrangements that create a haunting sound. Their first album, Imperfecta, was released in June 2012.

Sparhawk plays in a Neil Young tribute band called Tired Eyes.

Honors and awards
The band has been honored with a star on the outside mural of the Minneapolis nightclub First Avenue, recognizing performers that have played sold-out shows or have otherwise demonstrated a major contribution to the culture at the iconic venue. Receiving a star "might be the most prestigious public honor an artist can receive in Minneapolis," according to journalist Steve Marsh.

Members
Current members
Alan Sparhawk – vocals, guitar (1993–present)

Former members
Mimi Parker – vocals, drums, percussion (1993–2022; died 2022)
John Nichols – bass guitar (1993–1994)
Zak Sally – bass guitar (1994–2005)
Matt Livingston – bass guitar (2005–2008)
Steve Garrington – bass guitar (2008–2020)
Liz Draper – bass guitar (2021–2022; touring)

Discography

Studio albums

Note

EPs
 Low (Summershine, 1994)
 Finally... (Vernon Yard Recordings, 1996)
 Transmission (Vernon Yard Recordings, 1996)
 Songs for a Dead Pilot (Kranky, 1997)
 Christmas (Kranky, 1999)
 Bombscare with Spring Heel Jack (Tugboat, 2000)
 The Exit Papers (Temporary Residence Limited, 2000) – "a soundtrack to an imaginary film"
 In the Fishtank 7 with Dirty Three (In the Fishtank, 2001)
 Murderer (Vinyl Films, 2003)
 Plays Nice Places (2012)

Singles
 "Over the Ocean" (maxi-single) – (Vernon Yard Recordings, 1996)
 "If You Were Born Today (Song for Little Baby Jesus)" (7") – (Wurlitzer Jukebox, 1997)
 "No Need" (split maxi-single with Dirty Three) – (Touch And Go, 1997)
 "Venus" 7" (Sub Pop, 1997)
 "Joan of Arc" 7" (Tugboat, 1998)
 "Sleep at the Bottom" (split 7" with Piano Magic & Transient Waves) – (Rocket Girl, 1998)
 "Immune" 7" (Tugboat, 1999)
 "Dinosaur Act" 7", maxi-single (Tugboat, 2000)
 "K. / Low" split 7", maxi-single (Tiger Style, 2001)
 "Last Night I Dreamt That Somebody Loved Me" / "Because You Stood Still" CD single (Chairkickers' Music, 2001)
 "Canada" 7", maxi-single (Rough Trade (UK), 2002)
 "David & Jude / Stole Some Sentimental Jewellery" split 7" with Vibracathedral Orchestra (Misplaced Music, 2002)
 "California" maxi-single (Rough Trade (UK), 2004)
 "Tonight" 12", maxi-single (Buzzin' Fly, 2004)
 "Hatchet (Optimimi Version)" 7" (Sub Pop, 2007)
 "Santa's Coming Over" 7" (Sub Pop, 2008)
 "Just Make It Stop" (Sub Pop, 2013)
 "Stay" (Sub Pop, 2013) – Rihanna cover, digital release
 "What Part of Me" (Sub Pop, 2015)
 "Lies" (Sub Pop, 2015)
 Low / S. Carey – "Not a Word" / "I Won't Let You" (Sub Pop, 2016, Record Store Day Release)'
 "Let's Stay Together" (2018) – Al Green cover
 "Quorum" / "Dancing and Blood" / "Fly" (2018)
 "Days Like These" (Sub Pop, 2021)

Live albums
 Maybe They Are Not Liking the Human Beings (Saturday Night Beaver, 1998) – semi-official release
 One More Reason to Forget (Bluesanct, 1998)
 Paris '99: "Anthony, Are You Around?" (P-Vine, 2001)

Miscellaneous
 owL Remix (Vernon Yard Recordings, 1998)
 The Mothman Prophecies – Music from the Motion Picture – "Half Light (Single)", "Half Light (Tail Credit)" (Lakeshore Records, 2002)
 A Lifetime of Temporary Relief: 10 Years of B-Sides and Rarities box set (Chairkickers' Music, 2004)
 We Could Live in Hope: A Tribute to Low (Fractured Discs, 2004)
 Tonight The Monkeys Die (Low Remixes) (Chairkickers' Music, 2005)

Compilations
 A Means to an End: The Music of Joy Division (Hut Recordings, 1995)
 Indie-Rock Flea Market Part 2 7" (Flip Recording Company, 1995)
 New Music June (College Music Journal, 1995)
 The Paper 7" (Papercut Records, 1997)
 A Tribute to Spacemen 3 (Rocket Girl, 1998)
 Astralwerks 1998 Summer Sampler (Astralwerks, 1998)
 Kompilation (Southern Records, 1998)
 Shanti Project Collection (Badman Recording Co. Jr., 1999)
 Duluth Does Dylan (Spinout Records, 2000)
 Take Me Home: A Tribute to John Denver (Badman Recording Co., 2000)
 A Rocket Girl Compilation (Rocket Girl, 2001)
 Benicàssim 2001 (Festival Internacional de Benicàssim, 2001)
 *Seasonal Greetings (Mobile Records, 2002)
 Une Rentrée 2002 – Tome 1 (Les Inrockuptibles, 2002)
 Another Country – Songs of Dignity & Redemption from the Other Side of the Tracks (Agenda, 2003)
 Buzzin' Fly Volume One: Replenishing Music for the Modern Soul (Buzzin' Fly Records, 2004)
 The Trip – Snow Patrol (Family Recordings (UK), 2004)
 Duyster. (Play It Again Sam (PIAS), 2005)
 This Bird Has Flown – A 40th Anniversary Tribute to the Beatles' Rubber Soul (Razor & Tie, 2005)
 Rough Trade Shops – Counter Culture 05 (V2, 2006)
 Elegy Sampler 47 (Elegy, 2007)
 Sounds – Now! (Musikexpress, 2007)
 Dead Man's Town: A Tribute to Springsteen's Born in the U.S.A'' (Lightning Rod, 2014)

References

External links

 
 [ Alan Sparhawk on Allmusic]
 
 
 Alan Sparhawk on Silber Records
 Alan Sparhawk in Conversation, 2014
 Alan Sparhawk visits Kenya for the Maasai Community Collection charity
 http://www.npr.org/2016/03/10/469966998/gaelynn-lea-tiny-desk-concert?autoplay=true

Indie rock musical groups from Minnesota
Rough Trade Records artists
Musical groups established in 1994
American musical trios
Latter Day Saints from Minnesota
Sub Pop artists
Sadcore and slowcore groups
1994 establishments in Minnesota
Rocket Girl artists
P-Vine Records artists